Tsinga or Singa is a village in Indonesia located in Western New Guinea, in the kabupaten of Mimika Regency.

Geography 
Tsinga is found in the east of Indonesia on the island of New Guinea, in the kabupaten of Mimika Regency in Papua Province. It is located on the Sudirman Range of the Maoke Mountains, in the valley of the river Nasura, just before its confluence with the river Tsing.

The village is used by climbers who are heading for Puncak Jaya, the highest point of these mountains, of Indonesia, of Oceania and one of the seven summits, which are found within 12 kilometres as the crow flies northwards.

Demographics 
The village is inhabited by Papuan peoples of Amungme ethnicity.

References 

Western New Guinea
Villages in Central Papua